Graeme Neil Campbell (born November 4, 1954) is a Canadian film director, writer and editor.

Life and career 
Campbell was born in Montreal, Quebec to William and Thelma Campbell. He has made films for television, including individual episodes  and mini-series. He earned a BFA from Montreal's Concordia University.

He has been writing and directing movies and television for over twenty years. He started off making documentaries, but got his first break with the controversial feature, Murder One released by Miramax in 1988; the film was being directed by screenwriter Fleming 'Tex' Fuller, however after one week of principal photography Fuller was fired and replaced by Campbell. Starring Henry Thomas, the film is an uncompromising portrayal of a horrific crime spree gone wrong.

This led to another controversial true crime story, Deadly Betrayal: The Bruce Curtis Story, for NBC about the poisonous friendship between two teens. It caused Scott Watkins of the New York Times to write "Through the creative and brilliant direction of Graeme Campbell, the viewer is taken on a roller coaster ride through hell.  Using flashbacks, tense courtroom drama and frighteningly vivid jail scenes, Campbell and cast tell a riveting story."

Campbell's gift with actors is evident in such films as  Unforgivable starring John Ritter, "directed with a feeling for domestic Gothic by Graeme Campbell" according to Lynne Heffley of the LA Times.  He has worked with some of the best actors in the business such as George C. Scott, Elliot Page, Rachel McAdams, William Shatner, Mercedes Ruehl, and Elisha Cuthbert among others.

Although known in his early career for his handling of dark subject matter, he has directed films in many genres, lately many uplifting ones.  He has a passion for music and music stories which has led to Out of Sync a musical comedy for VH-1 and nearly half of the episodes of Instant Star for The N over the last four seasons. He won a Gemini Award for the episode "You Can't Always Get What You Want" and has been nominated for two others as well as two Directors Guild of Canada Awards.  Campbell has also written for and acted in the show. He credits his teenage children for keeping his worldview young; in keeping with this vein, he directed the two part Degrassi: The Next Generation special starring Kevin Smith.

His four-hour mini series Everest recently aired on CBC, and his latest film "An Old Fashioned Thanksgiving" premiered at the Hamptons International Film Festival in October.

Graeme Campbell lives in Toronto with his wife Gina, and two teenage children, Max and Emilie.

Filmography

 The Best Years (2 episodes, 2009)
 Degrassi: The Next Generation (4 episodes, 2005–2008)
 An Old Fashioned Thanksgiving (2008) (TV)
 Instant Star (14 episodes, 2005–2008)
 Everest (2007) TV mini-series
 Going for Broke (2003) (TV)
 The Eleventh Hour (2002) TV series (1 episode, 2003)
 Strange Days at Blake Holsey High (2002) TV series (2 episodes, 2003)
 Guilt by Association (2002) (TV)
 Mutant X (2 episodes, 2001)
 Dangerous Child (2001) (TV)
 Out of Sync (2000) (TV) ... aka Lip Service (Australia) (USA: DVD title)
 G-Saviour (1999) (TV)
 At the Mercy of a Stranger (1999) (TV)
 Twice in a Lifetime (1999) TV series (3 episodes, 1999)
 Dooley Gardens (1999) TV series (1 episode, 1999)
 Dream House (1998) (TV)
 Nico the Unicorn (1998)
 Volcano: Fire on the Mountain (1997) (TV)

 Country Justice (1997) (TV)
 Talk to Me (1996) (TV)
 Unforgivable (1996) (TV)
 The Outer Limits (1 episode, 1995)
 Deadlocked: Escape from Zone 14 (1995) (TV)
 The Man in the Attic (1995) (TV)
 Kung Fu: The Legend Continues (3 episodes, 1993–1994)
 The Disappearance of Vonnie (1994) (TV)
 Road to Avonlea (1 episode, 1993)
 Ready or Not (4 episodes, 1993)
 North of 60 (1 episode, 1992)
 The Odyssey (1 episode, 1992)
 The Ray Bradbury Theater (1 episode, 1992)
 Deadly Betrayal: The Bruce Curtis Story (Canadian title: Journey into Darkness) (1991) (TV)
 Street Justice (1991) TV series (1 episode, 1991)
 Into the Fire (1988)
 Murder One (1988)
 Blood Relations (1988)
 Still Life (1988)

References

1954 births
Anglophone Quebec people
Concordia University alumni
Canadian Screen Award winners
Living people
Film directors from Montreal